, abbreviated RIEC, is a research institute for electronic communication affiliated with Tohoku University, Japan. It is one of the national collaborative research institute in Japan.

Outline
On September 25, 1935, the institute was established as a research institute affiliated with the Facility of Electronical Engineering of Tohoku University because the importance of electronic communication research had got higher in Japan.
The pioneer research, such as the development of the Yagi–Uda antenna and divided anode-type magnetron, laid the foundation of the institute.

It comprises four research divisions with 25 subsections (including 4 subsections allocated for visiting researchers), three research facilities with 13 subsections and one externally sponsored research division with 1 subsection. It is one of the national collaborative research institute in Japan.

Organization

Administration Office

General Affairs Group
General Affairs Section
Cooperative Research Section
Library Section

Accounting Group
Accounting Section
Purchasing Section

People

See also
Tohoku University
Institute for Materials Research
Institute of Development, Aging and Cacer

External links and references
RIEC website
Tohoku University website

Sendai
Research institutes in Japan
Organizations established in 1935
Information technology research institutes
Tohoku University